Two Hearts in Harmony is a 1935 British comedy drama film directed by William Beaudine and starring Bernice Claire, George Curzon and Enid Stamp-Taylor.

Plot
A singer becomes the governess to the son of a widowed aristocrat.

Cast
 Bernice Claire - Micky
 George Curzon - Lord Sheldon
 Enid Stamp-Taylor - Sheila
 Nora Williams - Lil
 Gordon Little - Joe
 Guy Middleton - Mario
 Paul Hartley - Bobby
 Eliot Makeham - Wagstaff
 Julian Royce - Carstairs
 Jack Harris and his Band - Themselves
 Sheila Barrett - Dodo
 Rex Curtis - Butler
 Victor Rietti - Calvazzi
 Betty Thumbling - Pam

References

External links

1935 films
1935 comedy-drama films
1930s English-language films
Films directed by William Beaudine
British comedy-drama films
British black-and-white films
1930s British films